Samuel Bartlett (November 17, 1752 – September 29, 1821) was an American silversmith in Concord, Massachusetts, the founder of the Massachusetts Bible Society, a member of the Cambridge Humane Society, and also from 1795-1820 the elected Register of Deeds for Middlesex County, Massachusetts. He apprenticed with Samuel Minott in Boston.

References 
 "An influential and useful man": Samuel Bartlett of Concord, Massachusetts, David F. Wood, Colonial Society of Massachusetts.
 Massachusetts Bible Society biography
 925-1000 mark and biography

American silversmiths